Nicholas Cleaver (born 9 May 1975) is an Australian freestyle skier, who represented Australia in the Winter Olympics, in 1992 and 1994. He competed in the men's moguls and placed 11th out of 47 in 1992. He came 16th out of 29 in 1994.

References 

Australian male freestyle skiers
Olympic freestyle skiers of Australia
Freestyle skiers at the 1992 Winter Olympics
Freestyle skiers at the 1994 Winter Olympics
Living people
1975 births